The Clarion Area School District is a small, rural public school district which covers the Borough of Clarion, Highland Township, and Paint Township as well as most of Monroe Township in Clarion County, Pennsylvania. According to 2000 federal census data, it serves a resident population of 10,183. By 2010, the district's population declined to 8,978 people. In 2009, the district residents' per capita income was $14,302, while the median family income was $43,665. In the Commonwealth, the median family income was $49,501 and the United States median family income was $49,445, in 2010. By 2013, the median household income in the United States rose to $52,100.

The Clarion Area School District operates just two schools: Clarion Area Jr/Sr High School (7th-12th) and Clarion Area Elementary School (K-6th).  For students who wish to learn a vocational trade, the Clarion Area School District is associated with the Clarion County Career Center. The Riverview Intermediate Unit IU6 provides the district with a wide variety of services like specialized education for disabled students and hearing, speech and visual disability services and professional development for staff and faculty.

Extracurriculars
The district offers a wide variety of clubs, activities and sports.

Sports
The district funds:
Varsity

Boys
Baseball - A
Basketball- A
Cross Country - A
Football - A
Golf - AA
Track and Field - AA
Wrestling	- AA

Girls
Basketball - A
Cheer - AAAA
Cross Country - A
Golf - AA
Soccer (Fall) - A
Softball - A
Track and Field - AA
Volleyball - A

Junior High Middle School Sports

Boys
Baseball
Basketball
Cross Country
Football
Golf
Track and Field
Wrestling	

Girls
Basketball
Cheer
Cross Country
Golf
Soccer (Fall)
Softball 
Track and Field
Volleyball

According to PIAA directory July 2013

References

School districts in Clarion County, Pennsylvania